Ophiusa tirhaca, the green drab, is a moth of the family Erebidae. The species was first described by Pieter Cramer in 1777. It is found in southern Europe, Africa, Australia and the southern parts of Asia.

The wingspan is about 50 mm.

The larvae feed on heath, Pistacia lentiscus, Pistacia terebinthus, Cotinus coggygria, Rhus coriaria, Rhus cotinus, Cistus, Eucalyptus, Osyris, Viburnum and Pelargonium.

Gallery

References

External links

African Moths
Ophiusa tirhaca in France
Lepiforum e.V.

Ophiusa
Moths of Europe
Moths of Cape Verde
Moths of Africa
Moths of Asia
Moths of the Middle East
Moths of Japan
Moths of Madagascar
Moths of Mauritius
Moths described in 1777
Taxa named by Pieter Cramer